is a former Japanese idol and talent from Tokyo. She is formerly represented by Biscuit Entertainment, and is a second generation member of the Japanese idol group Idoling!!!.

Filmography

Movies 
 Maria-sama ga Miteru (2010) as Yoshino Shimazu

TV dramas 
 Great Teacher Onizuka (2012) as Megumi Asakura (Fuji TV)
 Ryomaden (2010) as Sato (NHK)

Anime 
 Code Geass (2006) as Miya I. Hillmick

References

1992 births
Living people
Japanese television personalities
Japanese idols
People from Tokyo
Japanese female models
21st-century Japanese actresses